Eachanari Vinayagar Temple is a temple dedicated to Hindu god Vinayagar, situated in the village Eachanari near Coimbatore, Tamil Nadu, India. The temple is situated about 12 km from the city of Coimbatore on NH 209.

History
It is said that when the idol of Vinayaga measuring 6 feet high and 3 feet in diameter was being transported from Madurai in a cart for installation at Perur Pateeswarar Temple, the axle of the cart broke and it got seated in (eachanari) the place where the temple was constructed.

References

External links 
 

Hindu temples in Coimbatore district
Buildings and structures in Coimbatore